Calf Island, also known as Apthorps Island, is a windswept island situated some  offshore of downtown Boston in the Boston Harbor Islands National Recreation Area. Access is by private boat only.

In the 17th century the island was granted to William Brewster of Plymouth Colony, after whom the adjacent islands of Great Brewster, Little Brewster, Middle Brewster and Outer Brewster are named. Subsequently, it was owned by Charles Apthorp who also owned Long Island and other property in the harbor. Over the years, several huts and houses were built on the island, including a colonial style summer estate built by Benjamin P. Cheney, Jr. and his wife, actress Julia Arthur, in 1902. Today only ruins remain.
 
Illegal boxing matches were staged on the island in the late 19th century.

In the 1920s, the Army planned to install a pair of  guns on Calf Island as part of the Harbor Defenses of Boston, along with  gun batteries on Deer Island (now underneath the Deer Island Waste Water Treatment Plant) and Hog Island (now called Spinnaker Island), to cover the seaward approaches to Boston Harbor.  The battery on Calf Island was never built.

References

Boston Harbor islands
Islands of Suffolk County, Massachusetts